Medan Tuanku is a major area in downtown Kuala Lumpur. Jalan Medan Tuanku and Jalan Tuanku Abdul Rahman are the primary roads in this area. Medan Tuanku borders Dang Wangi to the east and south and Chow Kit to the north.

Attractions
The Maju Junction shopping centre is located here, as well as the Quill City Mall. Loke Yew's mansion is located in a secluded corner of this ward.

Public transportation
Medan Tuanku lends its name to the  Medan Tuanku Monorail station. The  Dang Wangi and  Sultan Ismail LRT stations are nearby.

Suburbs in Kuala Lumpur